Righeira is the debut studio album by the Italian Italo disco duo Righeira. Produced by La Bionda, it was released on the CGD label on 28 September 1983 in Italy, following the success of the band's first two singles "Vamos a la playa" which reached number 53 on the UK Singles Chart, and "No Tengo Dinero", which reached number 10 on the Dutch Top 40 chart.

Aside from their already released singles, including the debut single "Tanzen mit Righeira", Righeira recorded the majority of Righeira during studio sessions in Munich, West Germany between August and September 1983. Of the album's 8 songs, six were written by Johnson Righeira.

Recording and production 

In August 1983, Righeira convened at Weryton Studios in Munich, with engineers Berthold Weindorf and Ben Fenner. By September 1983, eight songs had been recorded and mixed. Righeira were introduced to La Bionda in 1982 and they signed a contract which lasted to 1987. As Michelangelo and Carmelo La Bionda had moved their productions to Munich in the mid-1970s, and Righeira was signed to them, they decided they would record their debut album there. La Bionda gave Righeira a chance to experiment with their own sound. Many of the album's songs featured a futuristic and modern sound, including "Vamos a la playa" whose lyrics talks about the explosion of an atomic bomb.

Packaging 

Atipiqa designed and art-directed the album cover for Righeira.

The front of the LP includes a colourful picture featuring Righeira in costumes, standing square in an imaginary museum. The left side of the cover depicts a woman standing on a pedestal. Writing for Rolling Stone in 2018,  Eric Pfeil jokingly compared the cover of the album to "Nik Kershaw's hairspray collection", referring to the 1980s style.

Release 

Righeira was released on the CGD label in Italy on 28 September 1983. Initially, the album was planned to be released just before Christmas. The album spawned the hit singles "Vamos a la playa" and "No Tengo Dinero" which helped Righeira with establishing a reputation as a modern dance duo. "Vamos a la playa" had already became a fan favourite as it was released several months before the debut album. The song managed to reach number 53 on the UK Singles Chart and ultimately made Stefano Righi and Stefano Rota famous in continental Europe. "No Tengo Dinero" achieved high popularity in the Netherlands and West Germany, peaking at number 10 and 12, respectively.

Critical reception 

In his 2018 review of the album, author Diego Olivas of Fond/Sound wrote:

Track listing 

All tracks written by Righeira, except "Jazz Musik" by Hermann Weindorf.

Notes

 Some cassette tape versions in Italy and Germany had "No Tengo Dinero" and "Vamos a la playa" swapped to be sequenced as the first track on both sides.

Personnel 

Credits adapted from the album's liner notes.

Righeira

 Johnson Righeira – lead, harmony and background vocals
 Michael Righeira – harmony and background vocals

Additional musicians

 Hermann Weindorf – piano, synthesizer on "Jazz Musik"
 Mats Björklund – guitar
 Günter Gebauer – bass guitar
 Curt Cress – drums
 Dhana Moray – background vocals on "Kon Tiki"

Production

 Carmelo La Bionda – producer
 Michelangelo La Bionda – producer
 Hermann Weindorf – producer
 Berthold Weindorf – engineer, mixing
 Ben Fenner – engineer, mixing

Artwork

 Atipiqa – design

Notes

References

Bibliography

External links 

 

1983 debut albums
Albums produced by La Bionda
Compagnia Generale del Disco albums
Righeira albums